Tim Robinson is an English football referee who officiates mainly in the English Championship He is in the Select 2 Group match officials. On 14 December 2019 he officiated his first Premier League Game. The game was Burnley vs Newcastle which ended 1-0 for Burnley.

References 

English football referees
Living people
Date of birth missing (living people)
Year of birth missing (living people)